Lethal Obsession (also known as The Joker) is a 1987 German crime-thriller film written and directed by Peter Patzak and starring Peter Maffay, Tahnee Welch, Michael York, Armin Mueller-Stahl, Elliott Gould, and Massimo Ghini.

Plot

Cast

References

External links 

1987 films
1980s crime thriller films
German crime thriller films
West German films
Films directed by Peter Patzak
Films set in Hamburg
1980s German-language films
English-language German films
1980s English-language films
1987 multilingual films
German multilingual films
1980s German films